Westrveg. The second of three albums by the Norwegian synth-duo Langsomt Mot Nord. 

Label: CBS

Record No: CBS 461165 2

Release year: 1988

Musicians: Ola Snortheim; drums, sequencing. Morgan Lindstrøm; keyboards, programming.

Guest musicians: Olav Snortheim; bukkehorn. Knut Buen; hardanger fiddle (hardingfele). Brynjar Hoff; oboe. Steinar Ofsdal; willow flute. Carl Anders Sponberg; violin. Atle Sponberg; violin. Eva Knardahl; grand piano. Jon Eberson; guitars.

Producers: Snortheim/Lindstrøm.

Technicians: Anders Lind, Jan Erik Kongshaug, Øystein Boassen.

Recording locations: Silence Studio, Rainbow Studio

Tracks

 Westrveg (3:10)Arranged By – Morgan Lindstrøm, Ola SnortheimComposed By – Ola Snortheim, Morgan LindstrømDrum Programming – Ola Snortheim Hardingfele – Knut BuenKeyboards – Morgan LindstrømProducer – Ola Snortheim, Morgan LindstrømViolin – Atle Sponberg
 Gufsi Fraa Fjellom (3:53)Arranged By – Morgan Lindstrøm, Ola SnortheimComposed By – Ola Snortheim, TraditionalDrum Programming – Ola SnortheimElectric Guitar – Jon EbersonHardingfele – Knut BuenKeyboards – Morgan LindstrømProducer – Ola Snortheim, Morgan LindstrømViolin – Carl Anders Sponberg
 Tirilith (2:54)Arranged By – Morgan Lindstrøm, Ola SnortheimComposed By – Ola Snortheim, Morgan LindstrømDrum Programming – Ola SnortheimKeyboards – Morgan LindstrømOboe – Brynjar HoffPercussion – Ola SnortheimProducer – Ola Snortheim, Morgan LindstrømViolin – Atle Sponberg
 Gjetarlåter Fra Valdres Og Gudbrandsdal (3:12)Arranged By – Morgan Lindstrøm, Ola SnortheimBukkehorn – Olav SnortheimComposed By – TraditionalElectric Guitar – Jon EbersonKeyboards – Morgan LindstrømPercussion – Ola SnortheimProducer – Ola Snortheim, Morgan Lindstrøm
 Euryanthe (3:51)Arranged By – Morgan Lindstrøm, Ola SnortheimComposed By – Morgan Lindstrøm, Ola SnortheimDrum Programming – Ola SnortheimElectric Guitar – Jon EbersonKeyboards – Morgan LindstrømProducer – Ola Snortheim, Morgan Lindstrøm
 Sibilja (3:08)Arranged By – Morgan Lindstrøm, Ola SnortheimComposed By – Ola Snortheim, Morgan LindstrømDrum Programming – Ola SnortheimKeyboards – Morgan LindstrømOboe – Brynjar HoffPercussion – Ola SnortheimProducer – Ola Snortheim, Morgan LindstrømViolin – Atle Sponberg
 Seljespretten (4:22)Arranged By – Morgan Lindstrøm, Ola SnortheimComposed By – TraditionalDrum Programming – Ola SnortheimElectric Guitar – Jon EbersonGrand Piano – Eva KnardahlKeyboards – Morgan LindstrømPercussion – Ola SnortheimProducer – Ola Snortheim, Morgan LindstrømWillow Flute – Steinar Ofsdal
 Fäbodpsalm (3:56)Arranged By – Morgan Lindstrøm, Ola SnortheimComposed By – TraditionalDrum Programming – Ola SnortheimKeyboards – Morgan LindstrømOboe – Brynjar HoffProducer – Ola Snortheim, Morgan LindstrømViolin – Atle Sponberg
 Naglet Til Et Kors Paa Jorden (2:33)Arranged By – Morgan Lindstrøm, Ola SnortheimBukkehorn – Olav SnortheimComposed By – TraditionalKeyboards – Morgan LindstrømProducer – Ola Snortheim, Morgan Lindstrøm
 Faërie (1:54)Arranged By – Morgan Lindstrøm, Ola SnortheimComposed By – Ola SnortheimKeyboards – Morgan LindstrømPercussion – Ola SnortheimProducer – Ola Snortheim, Morgan LindstrømViolin – Atle Sponberg
 Heksesabbat (3:56)Arranged By – Morgan Lindstrøm, Ola SnortheimComposed By – Ola SnortheimDrum Programming – Ola SnortheimElectric Guitar – Jon EbersonKeyboards – Morgan LindstrømProducer – Ola Snortheim, Morgan Lindstrøm
 Nordafjølls (2:47)Arranged By – Morgan Lindstrøm, Ola SnortheimComposed By – TraditionalElectric Guitar – Jon EbersonHardingfele – Knut BuenKeyboards – Morgan LindstrømPercussion – Ola SnortheimProducer – Ola Snortheim, Morgan LindstrømWillow Flute – Steinar Ofsdal
 Gjallarhorne (4:06)Arranged By – Morgan Lindstrøm, Ola SnortheimComposed By – Ola SnortheimDrum Programming – Ola SnortheimKeyboards – Morgan LindstrømProducer – Ola Snortheim, Morgan Lindstrøm

Credits

 Drum Programming, Drums – Ola Snortheim
 Keyboards, Synthesizers – Morgan Lindstrøm
 Programming – Morgan Lindstrøm
 Sampling – Morgan Lindstrøm, Ola Snortheim
 Sequencing – Ola Snortheim
 Sounds – Jørn Christensen
 Voice – Alice Bostrøm (tracks: 1, 11, 13), Eli Storbekken (tracks: 4), Ola Snortheim (tracks: 13)
 Technician – Anders Lind, Jan Erik Kongshaug, Øystein Boassen
 Mixed By – Anders Lind
 Illustration – Ida Vigerust Snortheim
 Cover Photo – Davis Hiser
 Liner Notes – Rannveig Snortheim
 Layout – Ola Snortheim
 Musical Assistance – Terje Wiik, Torstein Kvenås
 Other – AKAI/Norsk Musikk, Anders Sevaldson, Bjørn Melby, Digital-fabriken, Eva & Henrik, Jan Erik Andersen, Pro-Technic A/S, Sóley Sveinsdottir

Sources in Norwegian 

 Langsomt Mot Nord Wikipedia
 Westrveg (1988) Rockipedia

References

External links 

 Langsomt Mot Nord's official web-page
 Westrveg Discogs

Langsomt Mot Nord albums
1988 albums